Myelodes jansei is a species of snout moth, and the type species in the genus Myelodes. It was described by George Hampson in 1930. It is found in Zimbabwe.

References

Moths described in 1930
Phycitinae